Joseph Maxwell Cleland (August 24, 1942 – November 9, 2021) was an American politician from Georgia. A member of the Democratic Party, he was a disabled U.S. Army veteran of the Vietnam War, a recipient of the Silver Star and the Bronze Star for valorous actions in combat, as well as a United States Senator (1997–2003).

After returning from the Vietnam War having lost three limbs, he entered politics soon after recovering from his injuries. From 1971 to 1975, he served as a Georgia State Senator. He also served as Administrator of Veterans Affairs under President Jimmy Carter from 1977 to 1981 and as Georgia Secretary of State from 1982 to 1996 before being elected to a single term in the United States Senate. After leaving the Senate in 2003, he served on the board of directors of the Export-Import Bank of the United States from 2003 to 2007, a presidentially appointed position. From 2009 to 2017, he served as Secretary of the American Battle Monuments Commission.

Early life and military service 
Cleland was born on August 24, 1942, in Atlanta, the son of Juanita Wilda (Kesler) and Joseph Hughie Cleland. He grew up in Lithonia, Georgia, and graduated from Stetson University in the class of 1964, where he was a member of the Lambda Chi Alpha fraternity. Cleland was named outstanding senior in high school. He went on to receive a master's degree from Emory University (Georgia).

Cleland then served in the United States Army during the Vietnam War, attaining the rank of captain. He was awarded the Silver Star and the Bronze Star for valorous action in combat, including during the Battle of Khe Sanh on April 4, 1968.

Injury at Khe Sanh
In 1968, Captain Cleland was the Battalion Signal Officer serving with the 2nd Battalion, 12th Cavalry Regiment, 1st Cavalry Division during the Battle of Khe Sanh.
On April 8, with a month left in his tour, Cleland was ordered to set up a radio relay station on a nearby hill. A helicopter flew him and two soldiers to the treeless top of Hill 471, east of Khe Sanh. When the helicopter landed, Cleland jumped out, followed by the two soldiers. They ducked because of the rotor wash and turned to watch the liftoff. Cleland reached down to pick up a grenade he believed had dropped off his flak jacket. It then exploded, the blast slamming him backward, shredding both his legs and one arm.

David Lloyd, a U.S. Marine in a nearby mortar bunker, rushed to the scene, took off his web belt and tied it around one of Cleland's legs to control bleeding.

Lloyd said the unnamed soldier was crying. "It was mine," he said, "it was my grenade." According to Lloyd, the private had failed to take the extra precaution experienced soldiers did when they grabbed M26 grenades from the ammo box: bend the pins, or tape them in place, so they couldn't accidentally dislodge. This soldier had a flak jacket full of grenades with treacherously straight pins, Lloyd says. "He was a walking death trap."

Due to the severity of his wounds, doctors amputated both of Cleland's legs above the knee, and his right forearm. He was 25 years old.

Georgia state politics 

Cleland served from 1971 to 1975 in the Georgia Senate, and became an advocate for affairs relating to veterans. He was the administrator of the United States Veterans Administration under President Jimmy Carter, a fellow Georgian, from 1977 to 1981. He then served 14 years as Secretary of State of Georgia from 1982 to 1996, working closely with his future Senate colleague, Zell Miller. During this period, Cleland promoted a penny stock law in Georgia which would become the template for national regulations to curb stock manipulation abuses. In the 1992 Democratic presidential primaries, Cleland supported fellow Vietnam veteran Bob Kerrey.

According to an interview featurette with Jon Voight on the DVD of Coming Home (1978), Cleland also served during this time as a consultant on the Academy Award-winning drama set in a VA hospital in 1968.

In 1977, Cleland received the Samuel S. Beard Award for Greatest Public Service by an Individual 35 Years or Under, an award given out annually by Jefferson Awards.

U.S. Senate (1997–2003)

Tenure 
Following the retirement of Sam Nunn, Cleland ran in the 1996 United States Senate election in Georgia and won by just 30,000 votes over Republican Guy Millner. A third-party candidate, Libertarian John Cashin, garnered over 80,000 votes.

Cleland was viewed as a moderate in the Senate. Though he supported some Republican budgetary measures, and voted in favor of George W. Bush's 2001 tax-cut package, he was staunchly pro-choice and pro-environment. He voted against drilling in ANWR, and opposed Gale Norton's nomination as Secretary of the Interior in 2001. His record on national defense and homeland security was more centrist. He voted to federalize airport security after 9/11, and supported the war on terror. Cleland was strongly for free trade, voting to normalize trade relations with Vietnam, to make China's NTR status permanent, and to extend free trade to Andean nations.

Cleland was one of the 29 Senate Democrats who backed the authorization to go to war in Iraq. He later stated he had misgivings about the Bush administration's stance, but said he felt pressure in his tight Senate race to go along with it. In 2005, he said "it was obvious that if I voted against the resolution that I would be dead meat in the race, just handing them in a victory." He characterized his vote for war as "the worst vote I cast."

2002 election 

In 2002 Cleland faced Saxby Chambliss for the Georgia Senate seat. Cleland enjoyed a comfortable lead in the polls early in the race but lost much ground in the weeks running up to the election. In May 2002 Chambliss was trailing Cleland by 22 percentage points. Chambliss issued a press release decrying Senator Cleland for "breaking his oath to protect and defend the Constitution," because Cleland had voted for an amendment to the Chemical Weapons Treaty that would allow individuals from "terrorist nations" to be on United Nations weapons inspection teams in Iraq. The vote passed by a majority, 56–44. Fifty-five other senators also voted for the amendment, including Bill Frist, the head of the Republican Senate committee, who picked Chambliss to run against Cleland.

A week before the voting, an Atlanta Journal-Constitution poll showed Cleland ahead by five points, 49–44. By Saturday before the race, a poll by the Atlanta Journal-Constitution the lead had shrunk to 48–45 which was within the poll's margin of error. On election day, Cleland lost to Chambliss 53–46.  Some supporters blamed a Chambliss television ad featuring the likenesses of Osama bin Laden and Saddam Hussein while criticizing Cleland's votes against homeland security measures. This was based on the fact that Cleland had voted against legislation enabling the creation of the Department of Homeland Security on the basis that a provision limiting the rights of unionized labor had been inserted into the bill.  Cleland supporters claimed the ad questioned the senator's patriotism, while Chambliss supporters claimed it simply questioned his judgment. The ad was removed after protests from prominent politicians, including Republicans such as John McCain and Chuck Hagel, both of whom were also veterans of the war in Vietnam.

Post-Senate career 

Cleland was originally appointed to serve on the 9/11 Commission but resigned shortly after, having been appointed to the board of directors of the Export-Import Bank of the United States. Before his resignation, he said that the Bush administration was "stonewalling" and blocking the committee's access to key documents and witnesses. A key figure in the widespread criticism of governmental opacity regarding 9/11, he was quoted as saying in November 2003: "I... cannot look any American in the eye, especially family members of victims, and say the commission had full access. This investigation is now compromised."

In 2003, Cleland began working for the 2004 presidential campaign of Massachusetts senator John Kerry, also a Vietnam veteran; Kerry went on to win the Democratic nomination. Cleland often appeared at campaign events with Kerry and was considered by many to be one of his most important surrogates, partly as a symbol of the sacrifices made by soldiers for wars. On July 29, 2004, Cleland introduced Kerry with a speech at the Democratic National Convention.

Cleland's official Senatorial papers are held by the University of Georgia's Richard B. Russell Library for Political Research and Studies.  His Veterans Administration papers are held in the Jimmy Carter Presidential Library. In 2007, Max Cleland donated a large collection of Vietnam and personal political memorabilia to the library of his alma mater, Stetson University.  The Cleland Collection includes more than 800 memorabilia items, more than 5,000 photos, and hundreds of CDs, DVDs, videos, and films.

On May 21, 2009, President Barack Obama nominated Cleland to serve as the next Secretary of the American Battle Monuments Commission. He was appointed Secretary on June 3, and served in the position until the end of Obama's second term as president. Retired Major General William M. Matz Jr., was appointed as his successor almost a year after he left the ABMC.

Cleland died as a result of heart failure at his home in Atlanta on November 9, 2021, at age 79.

Awards 
Cleland received an honorary degree in 2001 from Oglethorpe University in Doctor of Laws.

Works 
 Heart of a Patriot: How I Found The Courage To Survive Vietnam, Walter Reed, and Karl Rove by Max Cleland, with Ben Raines (Simon and Schuster, 2009). .
 Odysseus in America by Jonathan Shay, Max Cleland, and John McCain (Scribner, November 2002). .
 Strong at the Broken Places by Max Cleland (Longstreet Press, updated edition, October 2000). .
 Going for the Max!: 12 Principles for Living Life to the Fullest by Max Cleland (Broadman & Holman, September 2000). .
 Controlled Substances Laws of Georgia: Code Title 16-13 by Max Cleland (State Examining Boards, Georgia State Board of Pharmacy, 1992). .

Electoral history

See also 
 List of members of the American Legion

References

External links 
 Biographical Directory of the US Congress
 
 9/11 Commission profile.
 Former senator, Vietnam vet promotes Kerry  The Daily Cardinal
 
 video interview 
 Entry in the New Georgia Encyclopedia 
 Max Cleland Collection at the Stetson University Library
 Dirty-Bomb Politics

|-

|-

|-

1942 births
2021 deaths
20th-century American politicians
21st-century American politicians
American amputees
United States Army personnel of the Vietnam War
American politicians with disabilities
American University faculty and staff
Democratic Party United States senators from Georgia (U.S. state)
Emory University alumni
Democratic Party Georgia (U.S. state) state senators
Military personnel from Georgia (U.S. state)
People from Lithonia, Georgia
Politicians from Atlanta
Recipients of the Silver Star
Recipients of the Soldier's Medal
Secretaries of State of Georgia (U.S. state)
Stetson University alumni
United States Army officers
United States Department of Veterans Affairs officials
Members of Congress who became lobbyists